Shahrak-e Serias (also Romanized as Shahrak-e Serīās) is a village in Mansur-e Aqai Rural District, Shahu District, Ravansar County, Kermanshah Province, Iran. At the 2006 census, its population was 765, in 176 families.

References 

Populated places in Ravansar County